CTBC Flying Oyster (CFO) is a Taiwanese professional League of Legends team competing in the Pacific Championship Series (PCS), the top-level league for the game in Taiwan, Hong Kong, Macau, and Southeast Asia. It is owned by CTBC Sports Entertainment, a subsidiary of CTBC Bank.

History

Founding 
CTBC Flying Oyster (CFO) was founded on 26 January 2022 by CTBC Sports Entertainment after it acquired the PCS spot of Machi Esports. The team's inaugural roster consisted of former players of Machi Esports and J Team: top laner Hsu "Rest" Shih-chieh, jungler Huang "Gemini" Chu-hsuan, mid laner Chen "Mission" Hsiao-hsien, bot laner Sung "Atlen" Ya-lun, and support Lin "Koala" Chih-chiang.

2022 season 

CFO finished third in the spring regular season after defeating fellow newcomers Deep Cross Gaming in a tiebreaker match, qualifying CFO for the first round of playoffs in the winners' bracket. After sweeping sixth-place Meta Falcon Team in the first round and second-place J Team in the second round, CFO took a convincing 3–1 victory over defending champions PSG Talon in the semifinals. This immediately qualified CFO for the spring finals, an achievement made in their inaugural split. However, CFO narrowly lost the PCS title after losing to PSG Talon in the final match of a full best-of-five series.

CFO did not make any changes to their starting roster for the summer split and finished fourth in the regular season after defeating Frank Esports in a tiebreaker match. This placement qualified CFO for the first round of playoffs in the winners' bracket, where they defeated Frank Esports in a best-of-five series. CFO then narrowly defeated first-place PSG Talon in the second round to advance to their second PCS semifinals, where they took a convincing victory over sixth-place Beyond Gaming. This victory qualified CFO for the 2022 World Championship as one of the PCS' two representatives. In the finals, CFO once again faced off against Beyond Gaming, who they swept to claim their first PCS title.

Symbols 
CFO updated its logo prior to the 2022 PCS Summer Split; the new logo emphasizes the team's abbreviated name rather than its full name. CFO's team colours are blue and yellow, and its team motto is "We are family", the company slogan of CTBC Bank.

Current roster

Tournament results

References

External links 
 

2022 establishments in Taiwan
Esports teams established in 2022
Esports teams based in Taiwan
Pacific Championship Series teams